Acanthopterygii (meaning "spiny finned one") is a superorder of bony fishes in the class Actinopterygii.  Members of this superorder are sometimes called ray-finned fishes for the characteristic sharp, bony rays in their fins; however this name is often given to the class Actinopterygii as a whole.

Taxonomy

The superorder Acanthopterygii contains the following orders:
 Series Berycida
 Order Beryciformes, alfonsinos, whalefishes and pricklefishes
 Order Trachichthyiformes, pinecone fishes and slimeheads or roughies
 Holocentriformes, soldier fishes and squirrel fishes
 Series Percomorpha
 Subseries Ophidiida 
 Order Ophidiiformes, cusk-eels
 Subseries Batrachoidida
 Order Batrachoidiformes, toadfishes
 Subseries Gobiida
 Order Kurtiformes, nurseryfishes and cardinalfishes
 Order Gobiiformes, gobies
Subseries Ovalentaria
 Order Mugiliformes, the mullets
 Order Cichliformes, cichlids
 Order Blenniiformes, blennies
 Order Gobiesociformes, the clingfishes
 Order Atheriniformes, including silversides and rainbowfishes
 Order Beloniformes, including the flyingfishes
 Order Cyprinodontiformes, including livebearers, killifishes
 Subseries incertae sedis 
 Order Synbranchiformes, including the swamp eels
 Order Carangiformes, jacks
 Order Istiophoriformes, barracudas and billfishes
 Order Anabantiformes, labyrinth fishes
 Order Pleuronectiformes, the flatfishes
 Subseries incertae sedis 
 Order Syngnathiformes, including the seahorses and pipefishes 
 Order Icosteiformes, ragfishes
 Order Callionymiformes, dragonets and slope dragonets
 Order Scombriformes, mackerels and tuna
 Order Trachiniformes, including sandfishes and relatives
 Order Labriformes, wrasses and relatives
 Order Perciformes, diverse order including perches, basses, gouramis,  scats, whitings, sticklebacks and snappers
 Order Scorpaeniformes, including the scorpionfishes
 Order Moroniformes, temperate basses, sicklefishes and spadefishes
 Order Acanthuriformes, surgeonfishes and relatives
 Order Spariformes, breams and porgies
 Order Caproiformes, boarfishes
 Order Lophiiformes, anglerfishes
 Order Tetraodontiformes, plectognaths including the filefishes and pufferfishes

Distinctive features 

 Pelvic spine present;
 Pelvic fin bone support anatomy;
 Ligament anatomy associated with upper jaw protrusion; and
 Two distinct regions of dorsal fin: one spiny and the other     flexible.[1]

Hypothesis relationships among acanthopterygians, spiny-rayed fishes
Figure 1 shows two very different hypotheses or interpretations, in the form of cladograms, of relationships among acanthopterygians, spiny-rayed fishes: Figure A from Nelson (2006) and B from Johnson and Patterson (1993B). Both agree on the major composition of the superorder Acanthopterygii, but significant differences include the placement of the mugiliform mullets and atheriniform silversides at the base of the lineage in A, whereas in B, those groups are considered higher, percomorph taxa.[1]

+Because of the extraordinary and remarkable distinctiveness of the fishes that are higher spiny rayed, roughly fourteen thousand eight hundred species in two hundred sixty seven families – it is a commendation to their outstanding suite of adaptations that they are in general acknowledged as a coherent group (Figure 2). Generalities beyond question can be made concerning the group in its entirety as well as the essential qualities that define the group, even though discussions and debates concerning taxonomic position and relationships among the different families and orders abounds. A number of families of acanthopterygians share two chief and principal innovations[1]
1.       In this group, protractibility and upper jaw movement are predominant. This is attained through the process known as ascending process or the progress and development of a dorsal extension of the premaxilla's anterior tip. This ascending process moves smoothly beside the rostral cartilage hitting the upper jaw further and down. A camlike link between the maxilla and premaxilla aids protrusion, wherein the maxilla rotates and helps push the premaxilla forward[2]

2.       The highest level of development is attained by pharyngeal dentition and action. In the pharyngeal apparatus, a redistribution of the muscles and bones’ attachments aids the pharyngeal apparatus. The retractor dorsalis muscle[3] now placed on the 3rd pharyngobranchial curve, pharyngeal jaws that are on the upper are likewise kept up essentially by the 2nd and 3rd epibranchial bones.

Acanthopterygians likewise usually have: ctenoid scales; an evidently symmetrical tail fin kept up by fused basal elements; maxilla excluded from the gape; a physoclistous gas bladder; anal and pelvic fins with spines; two apparent and evident dorsal fins wherein the first one is spiny while the second one is soft-rayed; pelvic fins located towards the front consisting of one leading spine as well as five or a smaller numbers of soft rays and pectoral fins situated next to the body; and an apparently evenly shaped tail fin assisted by combined or merged basal elements.

Several trends 
Several other trends in locomotion, feeding and predator protection identify and distinguish the fishes that are higher spiny-rayed and manifest growing change in the course of acanthopterygian phylogeny. A significant thing to remember is that these are the revolutionary and different from the fishes today, exercising control over the deep, rich natural environment of the marine and a number of lake habitats.

Phylogeny
The cladogram is based on Near et al., 2012 and Betancur-Rodriguez et al. 2016.

Notes

Sources
Acanthopterygii at thefreedictionary.com

External links
 Tree of Life: Acanthopterygii

 
Fish superorders